Cascades is a light rail train station in the MAX Light Rail system. It is served by the Red Line and is located in Portland, Oregon; it is the third stop north on the Airport MAX section. When the line first opened, trains paused here in order to simulate a station stop for timetable purposes, but the stop was not announced nor were the doors opened. In January 2007, the stop officially opened to serve customers of Cascade Station.

See also
Civic Drive MAX Station

External links
Station information (with eastbound/southbound ID number) from TriMet
Station information (with westbound/northbound ID number) from TriMet
MAX Light Rail Stations – more general TriMet page

MAX Light Rail stations
Railway stations in the United States opened in 2007
MAX Red Line
2007 establishments in Oregon
Railway stations in Portland, Oregon